Jesoni Vitusagavulu is a Fijian businessman and diplomat, who was appointed as Fiji's fifth Fijian Ambassador to the United States on 26 May 2005, succeeding Anare Jale.  He is also accredited as Ambassador to Cuba and Mexico, and High Commissioner to Canada.  He presented his credentials to President George W. Bush on 3 October 2005, and to Governor-General Michaëlle Jean of Canada on 13 June 2006.

Background and education 
Vitusagavulu is a native of Kadavu Island. After graduating from the University of the South Pacific with a Bachelor's degree in economics and politics, he completed a Master of Philosophy in development studies from the University of Sussex in the United Kingdom.  He also received a diploma in airline management from the University of Bar Ilan in Israel, and a graduate certificate in management from the Australian Graduate School of Management of the University of New South Wales.

Business career 
Vitusagavulu was the managing director of Toptier Management, a management consultancy and investment company which he founded in 2003, specializing in assisting local and foreign investors in tourism, information technology, and audio-visual industries.  He was Manager for Special Projects with the Fiji Development Bank from 1978 to 1990, when he assumed a senior management position in Air Pacific, which he held till 1996, when he became Chief Executive of the Fiji Trade and Investment Bureau, a position he held until 2003.  Previously, he had served on a number of boards, including as chairman of the Agricultural Marketing Authority, Food Processors Limited, and the Kontiki Growth Fund.  He has also been a director of the Fijian Trust Fund Board, Kadavu Holdings Limited, and the Kadavu Development Company.

He also lectured for the MBA course at the University of the South Pacific.

Vitusagavulu is known to have been one of former Prime Minister Laisenia Qarase's closest associates.

Vitusagavulu is married to Silina. They have three daughters - Makenesi, Asinate and Leilani.

External links
 The Washington Diplomat Newspaper - Ambassador profile

References

Alumni of the University of Sussex
Ambassadors of Fiji to the United States
Ambassadors of Fiji to Mexico
Ambassadors of Fiji to Cuba
Fijian civil servants
Living people
People from Kadavu Province
High Commissioners of Fiji to Canada
University of New South Wales alumni
Year of birth missing (living people)
Fijian businesspeople
I-Taukei Fijian people